Kenny Lake School is a public school in Alaska that was honored by the Blue Ribbon Schools Program in 2005. Kenny Lake serves students in grades 1 through 12 as well as preschool and early childhood education. The school is a part of the Copper River School District.

References

External links
 

Buildings and structures in Copper River Census Area, Alaska
Public K-12 schools in Alaska
Schools in Unorganized Borough, Alaska